Telecinco Sport was a Spanish sport channel available on TDT, and owned by Gestevisión Telecinco.

On 18 February 2008, the channel was closed, and the frequency was given to Telecinco 2.

Programming 
Programmes of Telecinco Sport were provided by Eurosport News, that provided news bulletins related to national and international sporting events in a schedule between 7.30 a.m. and 1 a.m.
Initially it transmitted sport news every 15 minutes, and repeats of Formula One races and Superbikes

External links 

Defunct television channels in Spain
Television channels and stations established in 2005
Television channels and stations disestablished in 2008
Spanish-language television stations
Telecinco
Channels of Mediaset España Comunicación
Sports television in Spain